National Tertiary Route 614, or just Route 614 (or ) is a National Road Route of Costa Rica, located in the Puntarenas province.

Description
In Puntarenas province the route covers Corredores canton (Corredor, La Cuesta, Canoas districts).

References

Highways in Costa Rica